OpenWebNet is a communications protocol developed by Bticino since 2000.

The OpenWebNet protocol allows a "high-level" interaction between a remote unit and Bus SCS of MyHome domotic system. The latest protocol evolution has been improved to allow interaction with well-known home automation systems like KNX and DMX512-A system, by using appropriate gateways.

The OpenWebNet protocol is disclosed on MyOpen community.

OpenWebNet Protocol
The protocol is thought to be independent from the used technology. For example, it is possible to use a supervisor software connected via Ethernet, via serial RS-232 or via USB to a gateway that is directly connected to a domotic system.

Everyone can require protocol message extension. It is enough to propose your own RFC. It will be examined and disclosed if it respects  OpenWebNet syntax.

Syntax
An OpenWebNet message is structured with variable length fields separated by the special character '*' and closed by '##'.

The characters admitted in the fields are numbers and the character “#”.

The structure of a message is therefore:
field1*field2*… *fieldN##

The following fields are admitted:
WHO
WHAT
WHERE
DIMENSION
VALUE

WHO

It characterizes the domotic system function to which the OpenWebNet message is referred.

For example: WHO = 1, characterizes the messages for lighting system management.

WHAT

It characterizes an action to do or a status to read. For every WHO (and therefore for every function) there is a specific WHAT table.

The field WHAT can also contain optional parameters: WHAT#PAR1#PAR2… #PARn.

Example of actions: switch ON light, dimmer to 75%, switch DOWN shutter, radio ON, etc. 
Example of status: light ON, active alarm, battery unload, etc.

WHERE

It characterizes the set of objects to which the OpenWebNet message is referred. It can be a single object, a group of objects, a specific environment, the entire system, etc.

For every WHO (and therefore for every function) there is a specified WHERE table.

The tag WHERE can also contain optional parameters: WHERE#PAR1#PAR2… #PARn.

Example of where: all the lights of group 1, sensor 2 of zone 1 of alarm system, etc.

DIMENSION

Is a range of value that characterizes the dimension of the object to which the message is referred. For every WHO (and therefore for every function) there is a specific DIMENSION table.

It’s possible to require/to read/to write the value of one dimension.
Every dimension has a prefixed number of values, described in VALUE field.

Example of dimension: sensor temperature, loudspeaker volume, firmware version of a device, etc.

VALUE

It characterizes the read/written value of a written/required/read dimension.

Message
There are 4 types of OpenWebNet Message:

Command / Status Message
Status Request Message
Request/Read/Write Dimension Message
Acknowledge Message

Command / Status Message
 *WHO*WHAT*WHERE##

Status Request Message
 *#WHO*WHERE##

Request/Read/Write Dimension Message
Request:
 *#WHO*WHERE*DIMENSION##
Read:
 *#WHO*WHERE*DIMENSION*VALUE1*...*VALUEn##
Write:
 *#WHO*WHERE*#DIMENSION*VALUE1*...*VALUEn##

Acknowledge Message
ACK:
 *#*1##
NACK:
 *#*0##

Gateway OpenWebNet
It is possible to interact with the SCS home automation bus by using a specific gateway.

There are two typologies of gateways that allow a connection to the field bus by using different standard protocols:
 Gateway Ethernet (Linux-based)
 Gateway USB or RS-232

Gateway Ethernet
The current implementation by BTicino is also an embedded web server. It works as a translator between OpenWebNet messages via TCP/IP and the SCS messages transmitted on the SCS bus.

It is possible to control three different kinds of buses:
 BUS SCS
 KNX
 DMX

The Ethernet gateway offers two modes of authentication:
 via a list of whitelisted IPAs
 using a nonce-type password exchange (see in the external links for code)

Gateway USB or RS-232
The gateway is an interface that works as a translator between the OpenWebNet messages transmitted on USB or serial and the SCS messages transmitted on the SCS bus.

Functions

Example
OpenWebNet message examples

Command Message

Switch Off of light 77
 *1*0*77##

WHO = 1
WHAT = 0
WHERE = 77

Status Message

Scenario 1 of scenario unit 23 activated.
 *0*1*23##

WHO = 0
WHAT = 1
WHERE = 23

Request status message

Status request of probe 1
 *#4*1##

WHO = 4
WHERE = 1

Request Dimension Message

Request of Temperature Measured, probe 44
 *#4*44*0##

WHO = 4
WHERE = 44
DIMENSION = 0

Read Dimension Message

Temperature Measured, probe 44
 *#4*44*0*0251*2##

WHO = 4
WHERE = 44
DIMENSION = 0
VALUE1 = 0251 (T=+25,1 °C)
VALUE2 = 2 (System in "cooling mode")

Write Dimension Message

Volume set at 50%, environment 2
 *#16*#2*#1*16*##

WHO = #16
WHAT = #2
WHERE = #1
DIMENSION = 1
VALUE1 = 16

See also
 Home automation
 KNX
 DMX

References
 Moneta, D. Mauri, G. Bettoni, C. Meda, R. - Cesi ricerca (Italy) https://web.archive.org/web/20110706133239/http://www.cired.be/CIRED07/pdfs/CIRED2007_0522_paper.pdf Test Facility for the assessment of local energy management systems; 19th Conference on Electricity Distribution, Vienna (21–24 May 2007).
 Moneta, D. Bisone, L. Mauri, G. Meda, R. - Cesi ricerca (Italy) http://ieeexplore.ieee.org/xpl/freeabs_all.jsp?tp=&arnumber=4209527&isnumber=4209049 New interactions between LV customers and the network: further possibilities for home automation functions  ; IEEE International Conference on Robotics and Automation, Rome (10–14 April 2007).
 Bonino, D. Castellina, E. Corno, F. - Politecnico di Torino (Italy) http://www.cad.polito.it/pap/db/ictai08.pdf DOG: an Ontology-Powered OSGi Domotic Gateway; Torino (September 2008).

External links
 MyOpen Bticino
 IANA, TCP ports assignment. OpenWebNet is associated to port 20005 

Computer buses
Building automation
Home automation